Benedict of Soracte (Benedict of St. Andrew) was a tenth-century Italian chronicler, a monk at the monastery on Mount Soracte. The Catholic Encyclopedia article on Ecclesiastical Annals dates his chronicle to 968, but notes that it "unfortunately, is filled with legends".

References 

Italian chroniclers
10th-century Italian historians